Okkyung Lee (born 1975 in Daejeon, South Korea) is a South Korean cellist, improviser, and composer.

Lee moved to Boston in 1993, where she received a dual bachelor's degree in Contemporary Writing and Production and Film Scoring (Berklee College of Music), and a master's degree in Contemporary Improvisation (New England Conservatory of Music).

In 2000, Lee moved to New York and immersed herself in the city's downtown music scene. Since then, she has collaborated with a wide range of musicians and artists, including Laurie Anderson, Arca, David Behrman, Mark Fell, Douglas Gordon, Jenny Hval, Vijay Iyer, Christian Marclay, Lasse Marhaug, Haroon Mirza, Thurston Moore, Ikue Mori, Stephen O'Malley, Lawrence D "Butch" Morris, Jim O’Rourke, Evan Parker, Marina Rosenfeld, Wadada Leo Smith, Swans, Cecil Taylor, C. Spencer Yeh and John Zorn.

In 2013, Lee curated the Music Unlimited festival in Wels, Austria, giving it the title "The most beautiful noise on earth".

Lee received a Foundation for Contemporary Arts Grant in 2010. and a Doris Duke Performing Artist Award in 2015.

Discography

Solo 
 Nihm (Tzadik, 2005)
 I Saw The Ghost of an Unknown Soul And It Said… (Ecstatic Peace, 2008)
 Noisy Love Songs (For George Dyer) (Tzadik, 2010)
 Ghil (Ideologic Organ/Editions Mego, 2013)
 Dahl-Tah-Ghi (Pica Disk, 2018)
 Cheol-Kkot-Sae (Steel.Flower.Bird) (Tzadik, 2018)
 Speckled Stones and Dissonant Green Dots (Notice Recordings, 2018)
 Yeo-Neun (Shelter Press, 2020)
 Teum (The Silvery Slit) split album with Florian Hecker (Portraits GRM, 2020)
 나를 (Na-Reul) (Corbett vs Dempsey, 2021)

Collaborations 
 Rubbings, with Christian Marclay on From The Earth to the Spheres Vol. 7 (Opax, 2005; A Silent Place, 2006). Split LP with My Cat is an Alien.
 Still Life with Commentator, by Vijay Iyer and Mike Ladd (Savoy Jazz, 2007)
 Check for Monsters, with Steve Beresford and Peter Evans (Emanem, 2009) 
 Spiritual Dimensions, by Wadada Leo Smith (Cuneiform Records, 2009)
 Femina, by John Zorn (Tzadik, 2009)
 Dicteé/Liber Novus, by John Zorn (Tzadik, 2010)
 The Bleeding Edge, with Peter Evans and Evan Parker (psi, 2011)
 Anicca, with Phil Minton (Dancing Wayang, 2011)
 Cold / Burn, with Anla Courtis, C. Spencer Yeh and Jon Wesseltoft (Feeding Tube Records, 2012)
 Almost Even Further" with 6ix (Leo Records, 2012)
 White Cables, Black Wires, with John Edwards (Fataka, 2013)
 Look Right, with Nina de Heney and Lisa Ullén (LJ Records, 2013)
 Holding It Down: The Veterans' Dreams Project, by Vijay Iyer and Mike Ladd (Pi Recordings, 2013)
 Wake Up Awesome, with Lasse Marhaug and C. Spencer Yeh (Software, 2013)
 Piper, with Jon Wesseltoft (Holidays Records, 2014)
 Skein, with Richard Barrett, Tony Buck, Frank Gratkowski, Wilbert de Joode, Achim Kaufmann (Leo Records, 2014)
 Seven, by Evan Parker Electroacoustic Septet (Victo, 2015)
 Live at Stone, with Chris Corsano and Bill Nace (Open Mouth, 2015)
 A Pattern For Becoming, by Mark Fell (The Tapeworm, 2015)
 Live at Cafe Oto, with Bill Orcutt (Otoroku, 2016)
 Cloud of Unknowing on The Glowing Man by Swans (Mute/Young God, 2016)
 Amalgam, with Christian Marclay (Northern Spy Records, 2016)
 Obelisk, by Ikue Mori (Tzadik, 2017)
 Libra Rising, with Chris Corsano and Ches Smith (Digital release only on Bandcamp, 2018)
 The Air Around Her'', with Ellen Fullman (1703 Skivbolaget, 2018)

References

External links 
 Official site

South Korean composers
Living people
1975 births